Capitanopsis magentea is a species of flowering plant in the family Lamiaceae. It is native to northern Madagascar.

Description
Capitanopsis magentea is a large shrub or small tree, which grows to 1.5 to 6 meters high.

Range and habitat
Capitanopsis magentea occurs naturally in northern Diana and Sava regions of Madagascar, at the northern end of the island.

It is found in dry deciduous forests between sea level and 626 meters elevation, where it grows on karstic limestone, lava, basement rock and unconsolidated sand substrates. 

The species' area of occupancy (AOO) is estimated to be 48 km2, and the extent of occurrence (EOO) is estimated to be 5,221 km2. It is threatened by habitat loss from conversion to farmland, wood harvesting, and logging.

Taxonomy
It was formerly treated as the only species, Madlabium magenteum, in the genus Madlabium. A phylogenetic study in 2018 found that it was embedded in the genus Capitanopsis, and it was transferred to that genus.

References

Lamiaceae
Endemic flora of Madagascar
Plants described in 1998
Flora of the Madagascar dry deciduous forests